Iulius Mall is a chain of malls in Romania. It currently operates four malls in four cities:

Iulius Mall Iaşi
Iulius Mall Cluj
Iulius Mall Timișoara
Iulius Mall Suceava